Azfar Jafri is a Pakistani film director, screenwriter, actor and VFX artist. He is best known for his Independent film Siyaah which earned him a critical recognition and accolades including a nomination of ARY Film Award for Best Director at 1st ARY Film Awards.

Career
Azfar started his career as a 3D Character Animator and eventually became a vfx lead at Trango, where he worked on several television commercials for both local and international clients, including Lexus, Scion, Nike, UPS & Mobilink-BlackBerry.

Azfar's independent short films lead him to his first feature as a director, Siyaah, which was produced by Imran Raza Kazmi and written by Osman Khalid Butt.

He was the head of animation for the 2018 movie Allahyar and the Legend of Markhor, both a critical as well as a commercial success, while also giving his voice for a key character, Hero.

After successful films like Janaan and Parchi, he is currently directing a PAF film Sherdil, set to release in 2019.

Another 2019 release will be Heer Maan Ja, a Punjab-centered romantic flick with action, drama and comedy which will reunite the team which produced his previous hits : producer Imran Raza Kazmi, actors Ali Rehman Khan and Hareem Farooq as well as Osman Khalid Butt as choreographer.

Filmography

Accolades

References

Desk, W. (2021, November 17). Usman Mukhtar drops teaser of upcoming film 'Umro Ayyar'. thenews. Retrieved February 25, 2022, from https://www.thenews.com.pk/latest/909413-usman-mukhtar-drops-teaser-of-upcoming-film-umro-ayyar

External links 
 
 
 
 

Living people
Pakistani film directors
Urdu film producers
Pakistani voice actors
Pakistani film editors
People from Islamabad
Year of birth missing (living people)
Azfar Jafri